Hendrik Roodt (born 6 November 1987) is a South African rugby union footballer. His regular playing position is Lock. He represents the Lions in Super Rugby and the Golden Lions in the Currie Cup and Vodacom Cup. Roodt has previously played for the Blue Bulls, Waratahs and Griquas.

He joined French Top 14 side Grenoble in 2013.

Hendrik Roodt is married to Mariska Roodt.

References

External links 

Lions profile
itsrugby.co.uk profile

Living people
1987 births
South African rugby union players
Golden Lions players
Lions (United Rugby Championship) players
Griquas (rugby union) players
Blue Bulls players
New South Wales Waratahs players
Rugby union locks
Afrikaner people
Rugby union players from North West (South African province)